Tuloy (Tolıy) is a rural locality (a selo) in Turochaksky District, the Altai Republic, Russia. The population was 196 as of 2016. There are 5 streets.

Geography 
Tuloy is located 35 km south of Turochak (the district's administrative centre) by road. Verkh-Biysk is the nearest rural locality.

References 

Rural localities in Turochaksky District